The 2018 Philippines Football League was the second season of the Philippines Football League (PFL), the professional football league of the Philippines. The season started on March 3 and concluded on August 25. The league was contested by six teams from last season's eight, after Meralco Manila and Ilocos United withdrew before the season began.

Ceres–Negros won their second consecutive league title on July 25 with three matches to spare.

Due to several issues with the league—such as the expensive home-and-away format as well as the lack of sponsors and TV coverage—the PFL was abolished after the 2018 season and was replaced by the Philippine Premier League. However, the Philippine Premier League also had numerous issues and was folded after only a single match day. The PFL was then renewed for a third season in 2019.

Changes from 2017
For this season, the league discontinued the play-off final, or the Final Series due to the introduction of the Copa Paulino Alcantara, the domestic cup tournament which was held after the league season. Thus, the PFL became a pure quintuple round-robin tournament where each club played the others five times—each club playing 25 games.

Teams
The eight clubs which participated in the inaugural season were granted license to partake in the 2018 season by November 2017. However, on January 8, 2018, FC Meralco Manila ceased operations in the senior club level and on January 18 Ilocos United F.C. announced their withdrawal from the league leaving only 6 teams for the 2018 season.

Stadiums and locations
On February 6, 2018, Kaya F.C. transferred from Makati to Iloilo.

Alternate stadiums
The following are alternate home venues for Davao Aguilas, Global Cebu, and JPV Marikina as approved by Liga Futbol, Inc.

Note: On February 6, 2018, Kaya F.C. transferred from Makati to Iloilo.

Personnel and kits

Coaching changes

Foreign players
A maximum of four foreigners are allowed per club which follows the Asian Football Confederation's (AFC) '3+1 rule'; three players of any nationality and a fourth coming from an AFC member nation.

Players name in bold indicates the player was registered during the mid-season transfer window.

 Former players only include players who left after either the start of the 2018 season or the 2018 Copa Paulino Alcantara.
 Also a holder of AFC nationality (Australia)

 Brad McDonald has both Australia and Papua New Guinea FIFA nationality.

League table

Positions by round

Results by round

Results 
The six clubs will play each other in two rounds of home and away matches. The final round hosting will be via drawing of lots. 75 league matches will be played in total.

First round

Second round

Final round

Season statistics

Scoring

Top goalscorers

Top assists

Own goals

Hat-tricks

Note
(H) – Home ; (A) – Away

Clean sheets

Discipline

Red cards

References

External links
Official Website

Philippines Football League
Philippines
2018